The Minsk Regional Committee of the Communist Party of Belarus, commonly referred to as the Minsk CPB obkom, was the highest authority in the Minsk Region of the Byelorussian SSR in the Soviet Union.

The position of First Secretary was created in 1938, and abolished on 25 August 1991. The First Secretary was considered the de facto governor of the Minsk region. The First Secretary was appointed by the Politburo.

First Secretaries

See also
 Communist Party of Byelorussia
 Byelorussian Soviet Socialist Republic

References

1938 establishments in Belarus
1991 disestablishments in Belarus
Communism in Belarus
Communist Party of the Soviet Union
History of Minsk
Organizations based in Minsk
Organizations disestablished in 1991
Organizations established in 1938